The Kopuaranga River (officially Kōpuaranga River) is a river of the Wairarapa, in New Zealand's North Island.

In December 2019, the approved official geographic name of the river was gazetted as "Kōpuaranga River".

See also
List of rivers of New Zealand

References

Rivers of the Wellington Region
Rivers of New Zealand